Mojtaba Karimfar (born 8 December 1987 in Andimeshk)  is an Iranian wrestler. He won a bronze medal at the 2014 Asian Games.

References

Living people
1987 births
Asian Games bronze medalists for Iran
Wrestlers at the 2014 Asian Games
Asian Games medalists in wrestling
Iranian male sport wrestlers
Medalists at the 2014 Asian Games
People from Andimeshk
Sportspeople from Khuzestan province
20th-century Iranian people
21st-century Iranian people